Saint-Martin-des-Bois is a commune in the Loir-et-Cher department of central France. Saint-Martin-du-Bois is situated in the Gironde department and Nouvelle-Aquitaine region. Saint-Martin-du-Bois is in the south-west of France at 32 kilometres from Bordeaux, the department capital (general information: Saint-Martin-du-Bois is 470 kilometres from Paris).

Population

Sights
The Benedictine Abbey of Saint-Georges-du-Bois is adjacent to the village centre.
The historic church of St. Martin possesses an open narthex.

See also
Communes of the Loir-et-Cher department

References

Communes of Loir-et-Cher